The Simpsons: Bart vs. the Space Mutants is a platform video game, the second based on the animated television series The Simpsons. It was released in 1991 for the Nintendo Entertainment System, Amiga, Amstrad CPC, Atari ST, Commodore 64, and ZX Spectrum, and in 1992 for Sega Genesis, Sega Master System and Sega Game Gear. It was published by Acclaim Entertainment on consoles and Ocean Software on computers, and developed by Imagineering and Arc Developments. In the game, the player controls Bart Simpson through five levels as he tries to ruin the aliens' plan to take over the world. Video game critics have given Bart vs. the Space Mutants mixed reviews, with criticism directed at the difficulty of the game, partly caused by restricted controls.

The Amiga and MS-DOS versions feature a unique animated intro, which resembles a digitized clip from an episode of the show.

Plot and gameplay
Bart vs. the Space Mutants is a 2D side-scrolling platformer. In the single-player game, Bart Simpson is the only one who knows of the aliens' secret plan (his X-ray specs allow him to identify aliens in human form, similar to the sunglasses from the 1988 film They Live) and he has to stop them from collecting the items they need to build their "ultimate weapon" to take over the world. There are five levels, in which Bart must collect or destroy a certain number of these items (purple objects in the first level, hats in the second, balloons in the third, exit signs in the fourth, and nuclear rods in the fifth). If Bart loses a life he says "Eat my shorts!" Another objective of Bart vs. the Space Mutants is to help Bart convince the other members of the Simpson family about the aliens' existence so that they will help him during the levels. This is achieved when Bart defeats a disguised space mutant, whereupon he collects a letter. Should he spell out the first name of a family member, said member will aid him in the boss battle. The five stages are the streets of Springfield, the Springfield Mall, Krustyland Amusement Park, a natural history museum, and the Springfield Nuclear Power Plant. If Bart exhausts all his lives, an end scene will be shown depending on what stage it took place, where the aliens gloat over their victory and/or mock Bart. If Bart completes the game, an end scene will be shown where the enraged aliens vow never to return to Earth, but try to accept defeat graciously and do something to pay their respects to the boy who thwarted them. Six months later, the Simpsons are vacationing in South Dakota when they notice a fifth face on Mount Rushmore that looks like Bart's.

In order to get to some of the items and progress through the game, Bart must use equipment such as rockets and cherry bombs, which are bought with coins that can be collected by getting rid of aliens. Bart is controlled on foot and on a skateboard. To get rid of aliens, which are disguised as real humans, he needs to jump on their heads, although some are just regular humans. The game increases in difficulty with each level, and Bart meets up with a boss at the end of the first four. The levels use elements of The Simpsons and some of the television humor appears in the game: for example, in the first level Bart can make a prank call to the bartender Moe in order for him to run outside so that the player can spray paint his purple apron (an example of an item that the aliens need) into a red color that the aliens do not want. The game includes some minigames.

Development
Bart vs. the Space Mutants is the first video game based on the animated television series The Simpsons, and includes the theme song from the show. The game was designed by Garry Kitchen, who previously developed Keystone Kapers and Pressure Cooker for Activision.

Kitchen stated the game was offered to him by Greg Fischback of Acclaim a few days before the first episode aired, asking him to look into The Simpsons as a property to develop it into a game. Kitchen stated the biggest hurdle in development was time as Acclaim really wanted the game to be available before Christmas. According to Kitchen, the deadline was missed. Kitchen hired Barry Marx, a friend from Columbia University to come up with gags in the game that would be appropriate for Bart.

It was published in 1991 by Acclaim for the Nintendo Entertainment System and by Ocean Software for the Atari ST, Amiga, ZX Spectrum, Commodore 64 and Amstrad CPC. The game was published in 1992 for Mega Drive/Genesis, Sega Master System, and the hand-held Game Gear console under Acclaim's Flying Edge label. A portable LCD toy of the game was also published by Acclaim in 1991. Imagineering developed Bart vs. the Space Mutants for the Nintendo Entertainment System, Atari ST, and Game Gear, while Arc Developments developed the game for the ZX Spectrum, Commodore 64, and Genesis.

Reception

The game was a best-seller. It sold  copies at $40 each.

Reviews of Bart vs. the Space Mutants have been mixed. Many critics have described the game as difficult. An author for the Italian newspaper la Repubblica said the levels are not easy, and the Swedish edition of Sega Force described the game as both difficult and boring. Nintendo Power (which rated the NES game 66/100) wrote: "Bart Simpson has finally made it to the NES from Acclaim. His adventure, though, is anything but a game for underachievers. This game is very challenging and could be frustratingly so to some players. The tasks that you must perform to complete the adventure require patience and skill."

The NES version of Bart vs. the Space Mutants received a B rating from Lou Kesten of Entertainment Weekly, who noted that "the biggest drawback of this game is its brutally difficult opening section. However, what makes it challenging are clever strategic puzzles rather than thumb-bruising acrobatics. Bart tests reflexes and imagination in a way all too rarely seen in video games."

James Leach of Your Sinclair gave the ZX Spectrum game a 92/100 rating, writing that "I'm really into this game. As far as I can see, it's got everything it should have. It's fast, it's easy in places and dead wicked in others and it's got a massive amount of variety. What more could you want? ... The graphics are very cartoony, as you'd expect, and there's pots of colour." Leach also noted that the idea of including minigames in Bart vs. the Space Mutants "is pretty inspired, and makes the game even more fun." A reviewer for Crash also gave the ZX Spectrum version a positive review, with a 91/100 rating. He praised the variety and gameplay of the game, and noted that "while it may sound pretty basic [...] it’s when you start discovering things, making use of objects, finding hidden treasures that it really comes alive. And achieving an objective is satisfying because the route to completion can be pretty tough (especially some of the platform elements)." The reviewer also noted that "if you’re a Simpsons fan the game’s incredibly appealing, the graphics all reflect Matt Groening’s cartoon very well. And how much of a fan you are dictates how much you’re really going to enjoy this [game]. Non-fans can still get loads of entertainment, but some parts may be frustrating if you’re not into the characters."

In 2009, 1UP.com editor Bob Mackey reviewed the NES game in 1UP.com's official Retro Gaming Blog. Although he liked the first level for "mixing an impressive amount of references from the show with gameplay that has a pinch of point-and-click adventure in", he expressed his dislike for the other levels: "Unfortunately, either due to lack of ideas or lack of time (most likely the latter), the rest of Bart vs. the Space Mutants doesn't quite live up to the promise or ambition of the first level; the remaining four stages devolve into a frustrating and generic exercise in platforming that lacks all of the little references that made the beginning of the game somewhat authentic." Mackey described the game's controls as "terrible".

Kitchen stated that he "thought the majority of the game played very well, challenging but not in an unfair way" while noting the later levels could use more tuning, but failed to get it due to scheduling. He stated that "building a game against a fixed ship date is never a good idea so I do believe the game's quality sufferet a bit because of compromises we made in an attempt to get it done in record time."

References

Sources

External links

1991 video games
Acclaim Entertainment games
Alien invasions in video games
Amiga games
Amstrad CPC games
Arc Developments games
Atari ST games
Commodore 64 games
Game Gear games
Imagineering (company) games
Master System games
Nintendo Entertainment System games
Ocean Software games
Platform games
Sega Genesis games
Single-player video games
Video games about children
Bart vs. the Space Mutants
Video games developed in the United States
Video games scored by Mark Cooksey
Video games scored by Mark Van Hecke
Video games set in the United States
ZX Spectrum games
Mutants in fiction